The Coolmore Classic, registered as the TAD Kennedy Stakes is an Australian Turf Club Group 1 Thoroughbred horse race for fillies and mares aged three years old and upwards under set weights conditions, run over a distance of 1500 metres at Rosehill Gardens Racecourse, Sydney, Australia in March. Total prize money for the race is A$600,000.

History

Name
The registered name of the race is Thomas Arthur David (TAD) Kennedy Stakes,  named after a former horse trainer and Sydney Turf Club committeeman Thomas Kennedy.

The race name has changed many times since its inaugural running in 1973.

The current race name is named after the sponsor of the race – Coolmore Stud.

1973–1974 - Fillies & Mares Classic
1975–1976 - NSW Thoroughbred Breeders Stakes
1977–1978 - Marlboro Classic
1979–1985 - Rosemount Wines Classic
1986–1988 - Orlando Classic
1989–1991 - Orlando Wines Classic
1992–1995 - Winfield Classic
1996 onwards - Coolmore Classic

Grade

1973–1978 -  Principal Race
1979–1983 -  Group 2
1986 onwards - Group 1

Records
 Fastest time at 1:27.21 - Shindig (1998)
 Most wins jockey - Jim Cassidy (4)
Satin Sand (1986), Kapchat (1994), Flitter (1995) and Shamekha (2004)
 Heaviest winners  - Emancipation and Sunline at 60 kg.
 Lightest winner   - Crimson Cloud 48 kg.

Winners

 2023 - Espiona 
 2022 - Lighthouse 
 2021 - Krone 
 2020 - Con Te Partiro 
 2019 - Dixie Blossoms
 2018 - Daysee Doom 
 2017 - Heavens Above 
 2016 - Peeping
 2015 - Plucky Belle
 2014 - Steps In Time
 2013 - Appearance
 2012 - Ofcourseican
 2011 - Aloha
 2010 - Alverta
 2009 - Typhoon Tracy
 2008 - Eskimo Queen
 2007 - Tuesday Joy
 2006 - Regal Cheer
 2005 - Danni Martine
 2004 - Shamekha
 2003 - Bollinger
 2002 - Sunline
 2001 - Porto Roca
 2000 - Sunline
 1999 - Camino Rose
 1998 - Shindig
 1997 - Assertive Lass
 1996 - Chlorophyll
 1995 - Flitter
 1994 - Kapchat
 1993 - Skating
 1992 - Acushla Marie
 1991 - Quicksilver Cindy
 1990 - Happy Sailing
 1989 - Red Express
 1988 - Strawberry Fair
 1987 - Bounding Away
 1986 - Satin Sand
 1985 - Avon Angel
 1984 - Emancipation
 1983 - Hooplahannah
 1982 - Sheraco
 1981 - Cordon Rose
 1980 - Stage Hit
 1979 - Phar Talk
 1978 - Princess Talaria
 1977 - Somerset Pride
 1976 - Crimson Cloud
 1975 - Vicenza
 1974 - Favoured
 1973 - Miss Personality

See also
 List of Australian Group races
Group races

External links 
First three placegetters Coolmore Classic (ATC)

References

Group 1 stakes races in Australia
Sprint category horse races for fillies and mares